Van Renesse is an old Dutch aristocratic family that stems from the town of Renesse in Zeeland. The current Belgian branch resides in 's Herenelderen Castle since 1540.

History
The eldest ancestor of this family was Jan van Renesse who is mentioned in a charter as a minor in 1318. The Dutch branch ended in 1855, the Belgian noble branch van Renesse van Elderen survived until modern times.

Heraldry
The Renesse coat of arms is depicted in the medieval Gelre Armorial (folio 84r).

Members
 John III, Lord of Renesse
 Camille of Renesse-Breidbach (1836-1904), Belgian writer and entrepreneur.

Lords of Warfusée 
 Jean VIII of Renesse, Lord of Warfusée  (1505-1549);married to Isabelle of Nassau; daughter of Henry III of Nassau-Breda.
 René de Renesse, 1st Count of Warfusée, 
 Alexander de Renesse, Count of warfusée, Lord of Gaesbeecq.
 Florence-Marguerite de Renesse-Warfusée
Philippe François de Berghes, 1st Prince of Grimberghen
 Frederik I of Renesse, born 1470 : Lord of Oostmalle;Married Anne of Halmale, Lady of Elderen and Warfusée.
 Frederik II of Renesse, Lord of Elderen
 René III of Renesse, lord of Elderen; married to Catherin d'Arkel.
 Claire de Renesse: married to Philippe II of Hornes, Lord of Bassignies : Imperial Lord Chamberlain.

Sources
Nederland's Adelsboek, 2004–2005, p. 153-165.
 Oscar COOMANS DE BRACHÈNE, État présent de la noblesse belge, Annuaire 1997, Brussel, 1997.
 Jean-François HOUTART, Anciennes familles de Belgique. Bruxelles, Office généalogique et héraldique de Belgique, 2008, p. 52.

Notes

References

 
Renesse
People from Schouwen-Duiveland
Belgian noble families